Vasohibin-2 (VASH2) is a multifaceted protein that is encoded for by the VASH2 gene. As a vasohibin protein, VASH2 is closely associated with the vascular endothelial growth factor (VEGF) family of proteins as well. VASH2 has therefore been implicated in playing a vital role in blood vessel generation (angiogenesis), especially as it relates to tumor growth, but it has also been observed in association with neuron differentiation as well as ameliorating the symptoms of diabetic nephropathology (kidney disease).

Function

Angiogenesis 

VASH2 is highly similar in structure (over 50% similarity) to the protein vasohibin-1 (VASH-1) which is produced by endothelial cells; therefore, VASH2 is considered a structural homolog of VASH-1. However, while VASH-1 has been shown to antagonize angiogenesis (encourage termination of blood vessel formation), VASH2 has been shown to promote angiogenesis, especially in invasive tumor cell types such as pancreatic and breast carcinomas. VASH2 is released in response to low oxygen (hypoxic) environments, such as those that surround tumors growths that have not yet metastasized. When VASH2 is released by the tumor cells in a hypoxia-induced mechanism, the tumor induces blood vessels to branch off and provide the tumor cells with nutrients. This is also how tumor cells are able to spread from one mass of cells into other organs. Therefore angiogenesis is one of the first landmarks of metastasis. When VASH2 knockdown tumor cells were observed in vitro, there was no effect on actual cell numbers, but tumor size was severely inhibited, and this was determined to be due to reduced angiogenesis to the tumor cell. This indicates that VASH2 plays a vital role in angiogenesis.

References 

Human proteins